Gaertner or Gärtner is a German surname meaning "gardener". Notable people with the surname include:
 Karl Friedrich von Gaertner (1772–1850), German botanist known as "C.F.Gaertn." or "Gaertner fils"
 Christian Gärtner (1705–1782), German merchant and astronomer, after whom is named:
 Gärtner (crater), a crater on the Moon
 132445 Gaertner, an asteroid
 Joseph Gaertner (1732–1791), German botanist known as "Gaertn."
 Friedrich von Gärtner (1791–1847), German architect
 Gottfried Gaertner (1754–1825), German botanist known as "G. Gaertn."
 Friedrich Gärtner (1824–1905), German architectural painter
 Gustav Gärtner (1855–1937), Austrian pathologist
 Carl Gaertner (1898–1952), U.S. artist
 Belva Gaertner (1885–1965), U.S. cabaret singer and alleged murderer
 Georg Gärtner (1920–2013), German soldier
 Hildesuse Gärtner (1923–2016), German alpine skier
 Bertil Gärtner (1924–2009), Swedish Lutheran bishop of Gothenburg
 Claus Theo Gärtner (born 1943), German television actor
 Jürgen Gärtner (born 1950), German mathematician
 Paul Gertner (born Paul Gaertner 1953), U.S. magician

See also
 Gardner
 Gardiner
 Gartner

German-language surnames
Occupational surnames